Jay Watson (born 27 May 1990 ) is an Australian multi-instrumentalist, producer, singer and songwriter. He is best known as a member of the psychedelic rock bands Tame Impala and Pond. Watson records solo material under the name GUM and, as of 2021, has released five studio albums under this name and two singles/ extended plays. In addition, he sometimes collaborates with fellow Pond member James Ireland as the duo GUM & Ginoli, remixing songs originally recorded by a variety of different artists.

Career
Watson was born in Carnarvon, and grew up in Northam, Western Australia. He was given the nickname Gumby, which referred to the clay animation TV show of the same name. When he began recording his own material, Watson shortened the name to GUM.

Under the GUM moniker, Watson released Delorean Highway digitally in Australia on 30 May 2014. Most of the material had been recorded in 2011, leaving Watson to note that "when it finally came out it felt so good! But it felt so old to me". An LP release of Delorean Highway was restricted to a thousand copies. The album was described as a collection of "paranoid pop songs" that are "mostly about falling in love and all of the things that he [Watson] thinks are going to kill him." In October 2019, Delorean Highway came at no.19 on Happy Mag's list of "The 25 best psychedelic rock albums of the 2010s".

In September 2014, Watson recorded his second album in London with the assistance of Jerome Watson. The thirteen track Glamorous Damage, was announced in September 2015 and was released on 13 November 2015. It was preceded by the single "Anaesthetized Lesson", which was remixed by Kevin Parker and released in March 2016. Watson described the title of the album as "about people glamorizing getting fucked up or being weirdos, when there is always a danger you could end up damaged yourself just through putting it on a pedestal". Watson occasionally performs live, using backing tracks. Pitchfork's Stuart Berman described the album as "the 8-bit, Nintendo video game adaptation of a blockbuster film".

On 3 November 2016, a third album titled Flash in the Pan, was teased on YouTube, and released on 11 November 2016. It was preceded by the single "Gemini". Described by the NME as "a swirl of looped vocals, Pond-y synth work and dreamy, subtle bass". Watson explained that it was "the first song I recorded for the album, and probably the most immediate". It featured a contribution by Sergio Flores on saxophone.

Watson currently resides in Beaconsfield, a suburb nearby to Fremantle in Perth, Western Australia. In December 2019, he and his girlfriend Lucy welcomed a son, Jack.

Discography

As GUM

Albums 
Delorean Highway (2014)
Glamorous Damage (2015)
Flash in the Pan (2016)
The Underdog (2018)
Out In the World (2020)

Singles and EPs 

 Out In The World (2020)
 Airwalkin''' (2020)

 With Pond Psychedelic Mango (2008)Corridors of Blissterday (2009)Frond (2010)Beard, Wives, Denim (2012)Hobo Rocket (2013)Man It Feels Like Space Again (2015)The Weather (2017)
 Tasmania (2019)Sessions (2019)9 (2021)

 With Tame Impala Tame Impala (2008), drums on "Wander", keyboards on "Forty-One Mosquitoes Flying in Formation"Innerspeaker (2010), drums on "Solitude Is Bliss", "The Bold Arrow of Time", "Island Walking".Live at the Corner EP (2010), drums on all tracksLonerism (2012), piano on "Apocalypse Dreams", keyboards on "Elephant"Live Versions'' (2014), keyboards on all tracks

References

1990 births
21st-century Australian singers
Alternative rock singers
Australian indie rock musicians
Australian multi-instrumentalists
Australian rock drummers
Male drummers
Australian rock guitarists
Australian rock singers
Australian singer-songwriters
Lead guitarists
Living people
Musicians from Perth, Western Australia
Psychedelic rock musicians
Tame Impala members
Pond (Australian band) members
21st-century drummers
Australian male guitarists
Australian male singer-songwriters